List of the statues and memorials in Yerevan, the capital of Armenia.

Standing statues

Decorative statues

Removed statues

References 

 Monuments of Yerevan in the Official Website of the City of Yerevan

Statues
Monuments and memorials in Armenia
Statues
Statues
Yerevan